Putt-Putt Goes To The Moon is a 1993 video game and the second of seven adventure games in the Putt-Putt series developed and published by Humongous Entertainment. It is also the last game in the series to use pixel art graphics.

Plot
Putt-Putt and Pep are invited by Mr. Firebird, a scientist friend of theirs, to visit his Fireworks Factory. While there, Putt-Putt enjoys making fireworks when a butterfly enters the factory through an open window. Pep chases the butterfly, but inadvertently pulls a lever that causes a fire cracker to emerge. Putt-Putt ends up riding on the fire cracker and is flown into outer space. After floating in space for a little bit, Putt-Putt lands on the Moon and he wonders how he will ever be able to get back to Cartown.

As Putt-Putt explores the moon, someone appears to be watching him. Soon, Putt-Putt drives on a bridge that breaks and he ends up falling in "moon goo". He honks his horn to call for help and a lunar rover (who was the one watching Putt-Putt) rescues him and fixes the bridge. Rover tells Putt-Putt about his backstory as a lunar rover, who was brought from Earth by astronauts, but was left behind when the astronauts returned to Earth. Rover gets the idea to buy a rocket ship for sale (it was turned into an ice cream stand) and takes Putt-Putt to Moon City, where the rocket is. To buy it, Putt-Putt needs ten "glowing moon crystals" (which is what aliens use as money on the moon). He and Rover also need the nose cone for the rocket, the steering wheel to steer the rocket home, the rocket fuel and the key to start the rocket up. Putt-Putt and Rover set out to collect all the items needed for the rocket.

Putt-Putt receives glowing moon crystals from the Crater Creatures by playing Alien Tag, gives the Man in the Moon a picture of himself for a nose cone, helps Rover reach a steering wheel on a high cliff, gets rocket fuel from Robbie Radar at the Gas Station and gets a key as a reward for doing a good deed (rescuing an alien from the moon goo). Putt-Putt buys the rocket with the moon crystals and gets it all set up. After everything is all set, Putt-Putt and Rover enter the rocket and it blasts off and lands back in Cartown. The townspeople witness this and are relieved to see that Putt-Putt is alright. Putt-Putt introduces the townspeople to Rover and everyone celebrates as nighttime comes and the Moon appears.

Gameplay 
The game uses the same mechanics as its predecessor including Putt-Putt's glove box inventory window, Car Horn, Radio and Accelerator.

Release
The 3DO version of the game was shown at the Winter Consumer Electronics Show in Las Vegas around early January 1994. Copies of the game came packaged with an activity book containing Math and English exercises plus a Putt-Putt pen.

Reception

In April 1994, Computer Gaming World said that the game "offers a classic adventure experience for children (and adults)".

The combined sales of Putt-Putt Goes to the Moon, Putt-Putt Joins the Parade and Putt Putt Saves the Zoo surpassed one million units by June 1997.

References

External links
 
 Putt-Putt Goes to the Moon at Humongous Entertainment

Putt-Putt Goes to the Moon
Humongous Entertainment games
Infogrames games
3DO Interactive Multiplayer games
Adventure games
DOS games
Linux games
Classic Mac OS games
ScummVM-supported games
Windows games
Point-and-click adventure games
Video games scored by George Sanger
Video games developed in the United States
Single-player video games
Children's educational video games
Tommo games